The Edgar Allan Poe Award for Best First Novel was established in 1946.  

Only debut novels written by authors with United States citizenship are eligible and may be published in hardcover, paperback, or e-book. If an American author has published a novel of any genre or under any name previously, they are ineligible for the award, unless the novel was self-published. Authors ineligible for the Edgar Allan Poe Award for Best First Novel may be eligible for the Edgar Allan Poe Award for Best Novel or the Edgar Allan Poe Award for Best Paperback Original.

Winners for the Edgar Allan Poe Award for Best First Novel are listed below.

Recipients

1940s

1950s

1960s

1970s

1980s

1990s

2000s

2010s

2020s

See also 
 Edgar Award
 Mystery Writers of America
 :Category:Edgar Award winners
 :Category:Edgar Award winning works

References

External links
 The official website of Edgar Awards

Lists of writers by award
Mystery and detective fiction awards
Edgar Allan Poe Award
English-language literary awards